Chachapoyas may refer to:

 Chachapoya culture, existed until the 15th century in the highlands in northern Peru
 Chachapoya language
 Chachapoyas, Peru, the capital of the province with the same name and the Amazonas Region
 Chachapoyas Province, Amazonas Region, Peru